The Advance-Rumely Company of La Porte, Indiana was an American pioneering producer of many types of agricultural machinery, most notably threshing machines and large tractors. Started in 1853 manufacturing threshers and later moved on to steam engines. Allis-Chalmers Manufacturing Co. purchased Advance-Rumley in 1931. The company's main works would become what was later known as the "La Porte plant".

Thanks to various mergers and acquisitions, the company's origins stretched as far back as 1853. However, the origin of the two components of the corporate nameAdvance Thresher Company and M. Rumely Companywere somewhat newer, though still long-lived in the agricultural equipment industry. The company was organized under the name Advance-Rumely in 1915.

History

Advance Thresher and M. Rumely

 

Meinrad Rumely emigrated from Germany in 1848, joining his brother John Rumely in the operation of a foundry in La Porte, Indiana. This operation had expanded by 1859 into the production of corn shellers and complete threshing machines powered by horses. Following success in this new field, Meinrad then bought out his brother's portion of the business and incorporated it as the M. Rumely Company by 1887. In 1895, the line expanded to include steam-powered traction engines. Meinrad died in 1904, but his sons continued to manage the business. Rumely's most famous product, the Rumely Oil Pull tractors, powered by hot-bulb engine using kerosene, was first developed in 1909 and began selling to the public by 1910.

Meanwhile, Advance Thresher Company was founded in 1881 with a factory in Battle Creek, Michigan. In addition to their namesake threshing machines, this company was a prolific producer of steam traction engines.

Acquisitions and mergers
From 1911-1912, M. Rumely Company began purchasing other firms in the agricultural equipment business. Both Advance Thresher Company and Gaar-Scott & Company of Richmond, Indiana were acquired during 1911. Then, in 1912, Rumely expanded further with the purchase of Northwest Thresher Company of Stillwater, Minnesota and the American-Abell Engine & Thresher Company of Toronto.

All these companies were first reorganized in 1913 as two connected firms: the existing M. Rumely Co. Inc. (effectively the manufacturing side), and the new Rumely Products Co. (the sales and distribution side). A further reorganization brought about the final Advance-Rumely Company by 1915, a move which both streamlined the organization and highlighted its famous forebears. Advance-Rumely hadn't quite finished its expansion goals, either: the Aultman-Taylor Company of Mansfield, Ohio was picked up in 1923.

Consolidation and takeover
Despite all of the history and diversity in engineering acquired along with all of their corporate assets during the 1910s, most of this was left by the wayside as Advance-Rumely sought to fold everything under its new brand name or that of Rumely. The general financial collapse of the Great Depression, beginning in 1929 and into the early 1930s, began to take its toll on Advance-Rumely.

As early as January 1930, the Rumely management began seeking a buyer for the company. Correspondence with Otto Falk, president of the Allis-Chalmers Manufacturing Company, proved fruitful. Allis-Chalmers agreed to take over the firm and did so by May 1931.

Rumely had discontinued its traction engine lines in favor of newer-style tractors. But Allis-Chalmers had a line of those that was quite successful. The remaining Rumely-branded tractors were discontinued. Allis-Chalmers was more interested in Advance-Rumely's line of threshing and harvesting machines (not to mention the sprawling plants that built them). Also, Allis-Chalmers bought Rumely's extensive dealer network, and instantly converted to the complete Allis-Chalmers product line. The "La Porte plant", as Advance-Rumely's main headquarters was now called, became known as the "Harvester Capitol of the World" thanks to its eventual production of Allis-Chalmers' successful All-Crop harvester line.

Allis-Chalmers would eventually succumb to bankruptcy and the dismantling of its vast business interests in 1985. But, by that time Advance-Rumely was only a memory.

Products
The following is representative of the bulk of Advance-Rumely's production and that of some of its predecessors.

Traction engines and tractors

Advance Traction Engine (1885–1917)
Gaar-Scott Traction Engine (1885–1914)
Rumely DoAll                (1928–1932)    22 hp
Rumely GasPull            (year?)
Rumely Oil Pull B25/45 (1910–1912)   50 hp
Rumely Oil Pull E30/60 (1910-1923)    84 hp
Rumely Oil Pull F15/30 (1911-1918)    33 hp
Rumely Oil Pull G20/40 (1918-1924)   44 hp
Rumely Oil Pull H16/30 (1917-1924)   33 hp
Rumely Oil Pull K12/20 (1918-1924)   40 hp
Rumely Oil Pull L15/25  (1924-1927)   27 hp 
Rumely Oil Pull M20/35 (1924-1927)   38 hp
Rumely Oil Pull R25/45  (1924-1927)   50 hp
Rumely Oil Pull S30/60  (1924-1928)   66 hp
Rumely Oil Pull W20/30 (1928-1930)   33 hp
Rumely Oil Pull X25/40  (1928-1930)   44 hp
Rumely Oil Pull Y30/50  (1929/????)   55 hp
Rumely Oil Pull Z40/60  (1929/????)   77 hp
Rumely Six/6A               (1930–1931)   47 hp
Rumely Traction Engine (1895–1916)
Rumely Truck                 (1918-????)
Each Oil Pull also had an associated Oil Turn stationary engine.

Combine harvesters
Advance-Rumely Number 1 Combine (1925–1929)
Advance-Rumely Number 2 Combine (1926–1930)
Advance-Rumely Number 3 Combine (1927–1936; line carried on by Allis-Chalmers after purchase)
Advance-Rumely Number 4 Combine (1928–1929)

Grain processing equipment
Advance-Rumely Corn Sheller (1924–1925)
Rumely Corn Shredder (1901–1928)
Rumely Thresher (1904–1936; line carried on by Allis-Chalmers after purchase)

In addition to these lines, Advance-Rumely also offered stationary engines, silo fillers, water wagons, cream separators, plows, and a line of lubricating oils designed for the company's tractor lines. In addition, there is evidence that the company produced a cargo truck, but data is scarce.

References

Further reading
 Wendel, Charles H. (1993) The Allis-Chalmers Story.

External links

 Some preserved Rumely tractors

Manufacturing companies established in 1853
Tractor manufacturers of the United States
Defunct agriculture companies of the United States
Manufacturing companies disestablished in 1931
1931 disestablishments in Indiana
1853 establishments in Indiana
1931 mergers and acquisitions
Defunct manufacturing companies based in Indiana
Allis-Chalmers Manufacturing Company